Eduardo Arozamena Lira (13 October 1875 – 21 May 1951) was a Mexican actor. His nickname was "El Nanche Arozamena".  

Son of Juan Arozamena and Guadalupe Lira y Argomanes. Initially a singer (baritone), theater actor, he later ventured into film, where he was also a director and screenwriter. 

He worked in Mexico as well as in the United States, where he participated in the famous 1931 Dracula Spanish-language film, directed by George Melford. 

He also entered literature as a storyteller, with his works being published in the weekly "Mefistófeles". He later authored the weekly column Parece que fue ayer ("It seems like yesterday"), published in the newspaper El Universal Ilustrado.

The National Association of Actors (ANDA) of Mexico named their most important medal, awarded to its members when they turn 50 years of career, in his honor.

Filmography

 Don Juan diplomático (1931) as Doctor
 Resurrection (1931)
 Drácula (1931) as Van Helsing
 Cheri-Bibi (1931) as Bourrelier
 El tenorio del harem (1931) as El mercador
 Tierra, amor y dolor (1935)
 Monja casada, virgen y mártir (1935) as Don Juan Gutiérrez
 Martín Garatuza (1935)
 Tribu (1935) as Zotil
 El rayo de Sinaloa (1935) as Don Antonio Fajardo
 Almas rebeldes (1937)
 Abnegación (1938)
 Guadalupe La Chinaca (1938) as Don Julián de Avellaneda
 Caminos de ayer (1938) as Stefano Mascagnini
 Perjura (1938) as Don Gonzalo
 María (1938) as Don Jerónimo
 El capitán aventurero (1939) as Don Martin, el corregidor
 Cada loco con su tema (1939) as Severo - Cedronio Conquián
 Perfidia (1939) as Ernesto, Baroni's Old Friend
 Luces de barriada (1939)
 Miente y serás feliz (1940) as Doctor
 Los de abajo (1940) as Venancio
 Here's the Point (1940) as Juez sordo
 Con su amable permiso (1940) as Don Ramón de Olvera
 El milagro de Cristo (1941)
 Las cinco advertencias de Satanás (1941)
 The Unknown Policeman (1941)
 El que tenga un amor (1942)
 Simón Bolívar (1942) as Presidente del Congreso del Perú (uncredited)
 ¡Así se quiere en Jalisco! (1942) as El Tata
 The Circus (1943) as Coronel (as E. Arozamena)
 Morenita clara (1943) as Padre Jesús
 Wild Flower (1943) as Melchor
 De Nueva York a Huipanguillo (1943)
 Doña Bárbara (1943) as Melesio Sandoval
 Mexicanos al grito de guerra (1943) as Señor Salas
 ¡Viva mi desgracia! (1944) as Don Doroteo
 Caminito alegre (1944) as Don José Limón
 Felipe Derblay, el herrero (1944)
 La vida inútil de Pito Pérez (1944) as Padre Jureco
 El amor de los amores (1944)
 Toros, amor y gloria (1944) as Don Leopoldo
 Así son ellas (1944)
 El médico de las locas (1944) as Agustín
 Balajú (1944)
 El mexicano (1944)
 Bartolo toca la flauta (1945) as Don Erasmo
 El precio de una vida (1945)
 El jagüey de las ruinas (1945)
 Sendas del destino (1945) as Padre de Carlos
 Flor de durazno (1945) as Padre Filemón
 Canaima (1945, uncredited)
 La pajarera (1945) as Don Margarito
 Dizziness (1946) as Don José María
 Rancho de mis recuerdos (1946)
 Rayando el sol (1946) as Padre de Lupe
 El jinete fantasma (1946)
 María Magdalena: Pecadora de Magdala (1946) as Caifás
 Enamorada (1946) as Alcalde Joaquín Gómez
 La fuerza de la sangre (1947)
 El conquistador (1947)
 Los cristeros (1947) as Tío Alejo
 Reina de reinas: La Virgen María (1948) as Caifás
 Río Escondido (1948) as Don Marcelino
 El muchacho alegre (1948) as Don Manuel
 La sin ventura (1948) as Don Nicolás
 La casa de la Troya (1948) as Don Servando
 Maclovia (1948) as Cabo Mendoza
 El gallero (1948) as Aurelio de la Torre
 Flor de caña (1948)
 La vorágine (1949)
 Bamba (1949) as Don Gumersindo
 Yo maté a Juan Charrasqueado (1949)
 El miedo llegó a Jalisco (1949)
 Café de chinos (1949) as Doctor
 Tierra muerta (1949)
 The Unloved Woman (1949) as Pastor (uncredited)
 La mujer que yo perdí (1949) as Abuelo
 Duelo en las montañas (1950) as Don Rodrigo Vargas 
 La negra Angustias (1950) as Antón Farrera
 Lluvia roja (1950) as Dueño de tienda
 Matrimonio y mortaja (1950) as Don Próspero
 The Torch (1950)
 Yo también soy de Jalisco (1950)
 La fe en Dios (1950) as Señor cura
 Un día de vida (1950) as Pomposo
 Pata de palo (1950) as Don Cástulo, abuelo
 Capitán de rurales (1951) as Tío de Hipólito (uncredited)
 ¡... Y murió por nosotros! (1951) as Filemón
 The Brave Bulls (1951) as Don Alberto Iriarte
 Fierecilla (1951) as Sacerdote
 María Montecristo (1951) as Profesor Fabré
 El suavecito (1951) as Sr. Soto, padre de Lupita
 La bienamada (1951)
 Sangre en el barrio (1952) as Don Andrés
 Un gallo en corral ajeno (1952) as Don Raymundo

Awards and honors

References

External links

1875 births
1951 deaths
Male actors from Mexico City
Mexican male film actors
Mexican male stage actors
Mexican film directors
Mexican male screenwriters
20th-century Mexican male actors
20th-century Mexican screenwriters
20th-century Mexican male writers